The interleukin 4 receptor is a type I cytokine receptor. IL4R is its human gene.

Function 

This gene encodes the alpha chain of the interleukin-4 receptor, a type I transmembrane protein that can bind interleukin 4 and interleukin 13 to regulate IgE antibody production in B cells. Among T cells, the encoded protein also can bind interleukin 4 to promote differentiation of Th2 cells.  A soluble form of the encoded protein can be produced by an alternate splice variant or by proteolysis of the membrane-bound protein, and this soluble form can inhibit IL4-mediated cell proliferation and IL5 upregulation by T-cells. Allelic variations in this gene have been associated with atopy, a condition that can manifest itself as allergic rhinitis, sinusitis, asthma, or eczema. Two transcript variants encoding different isoforms, a membrane-bound and a soluble form, have been found for this gene. Interactions of IL-4 with TNFα promote structural changes to vascular endothelial cells, thus playing an important role in tissue inflammation.

The binding of IL-4 or IL-13 to the IL-4 receptor on the surface of macrophages results in the alternative activation of those macrophages. Alternatively activated macrophages (AAMΦ) downregulate inflammatory mediators such as IFNγ during immune responses, particularly with regards to helminth infections. IL4 signalling also determines the levels of CD20 on normal and malignant B cells by activation the transcription factor STAT6.

Interactions 

Interleukin-4 receptor has been shown to interact with SHC1.

Structure 

The N-terminal (extracellular) portion of interleukin-4 receptor is related in overall topology to fibronectin type III modules and folds into a sandwich comprising seven antiparallel beta sheets arranged in a three-strand and a four-strand beta-pleated sheet. They are required for binding of interleukin-4 to the receptor alpha chain, which is a crucial event for the generation of a Th2-dominated early immune response.

See also 
 Macrophage-activating factor
 Macrophage polarization
 Cluster of differentiation
 Fibronectin type III domain

References

Further reading

External links 
 
 PDBe-KB provides an overview of all the structure information available in the PDB for Human Interleukin-4 receptor subunit alpha

Type I cytokine receptors
Clusters of differentiation
Protein domains